Wichita Jets are a defunct soccer club that played in the 2000 USL Premier Development League season. They played in Wichita, Kansas.

Jets
Jets
Defunct Premier Development League teams
Association football clubs established in 2000
Association football clubs disestablished in 2001
2000 establishments in Kansas
2001 disestablishments in Kansas